In civil engineering, a transient is used to refer to any pressure wave that is short lived (i.e. not static pressure or pressure differential due to friction/minor loss in flow). The most common occurrence of this is called water hammer. In a pipe network, when a valve or pump is suddenly shut off, the water flowing in an adjacent pipe is suddenly forced to stop. A region of high pressure builds up immediately behind said valve or pump and a region of low pressure forms in front of it. The momentum of the water is suddenly transferred into the fitting and Newton's Third Law kicks in forming a high-pressure region of water as it all "piles up" in the pipe. This high pressure region then travels back along the pipe in the form of a wave. The border of the high-pressure zone is referred to as a pressure wave, or transient (which is apt as the general definition of a transient is something that only exists for a short period of time).

Transients are often misunderstood and not accounted for in the design of water distribution systems and are often the cause of (or a contributing factor to) hydraulic element failures (i.e. pipe breaks, pump/valve failures, etc.).

External links
 Journal of Applied Fluid Transients (JAFT)

Hydraulic engineering